The men's 3000 metres event at the 2021 European Athletics Indoor Championships was held on 6 March at 11:25 (heats) and on 7 March at 17:52 (final) local time.

Medalists

Records

Results

Heats
Qualification: First 3 in each heat (Q) and the next fastest 3 (q) advance to the Final.

Final

References

2021 European Athletics Indoor Championships
3000 metres at the European Athletics Indoor Championships